Brimstone is a thriller novel written by American authors Douglas Preston and Lincoln Child, and published on August 3, 2004, by Warner Books. This is the fifth installment in the Special Agent Pendergast series and the first novel in the Diogenes trilogy that also includes Dance of Death (2005) and The Book of the Dead (2006).

Plot summary
FBI Special Agent Aloysius X.L. Pendergast and Sergeant Vincent D'Agosta, now working for the Southampton Police Department, investigate a series of unusual deaths—deaths that appear to be the work of Lucifer in return for pacts entered in with him by his victims.  Their investigation takes them from the New York City area, site of the first two deaths, to Florence, Italy where they uncover the motive and method of the killers behind the strange and gruesome deaths.  During the course of unraveling the mystery, the truth behind a priceless, missing Stradivarius violin is revealed and a potentially apocalyptic riot with Messianic Christians is averted. Pendergast also reveals details of his insane brother Diogenes, whom he believes is planning something horrible.

References to other literary works
The entombing of Pendergast in the catacombs under Fosco's home bears a deliberate literary allusion to the 1846 short story "The Cask of Amontillado" by Edgar Allan Poe. The dialogue when Pendergast futilely urges the Count to let him go because he has something important to do also has a strong resemblance to the Confrontation dialogue between Valjean and Javert in the hit musical Les Misérables.
An alias D'Agosta uses on the telephone, Jack Torrance, is the name of the main character in The Shining, a 1977 novel by Stephen King.
The character of Count Fosco is a tribute to the classic character of the same name, a villain in Wilkie Collins's 1860 novel The Woman in White.
The character Count Fosco refers to there being all types of detectives including Navajo policemen, an obvious reference to Tony Hillerman's characters Joe Leaphorn and Jim Chee, two fictional Navajo policeman.

References

External links
Brimstone page from Preston & Child's official web site
Review on Bookreporter.com
Excerpt

2004 American novels
Techno-thriller novels
Novels by Douglas Preston
Novels by Lincoln Child
Collaborative novels